Ten Most Wanted may refer to:

Ten Most Wanted (album), a studio album by Joey Yung
Ten Most Wanted (horse)
FBI Ten Most Wanted Fugitives, the most wanted list maintained by the United States Federal Bureau of Investigation (FBI)